Gobin de Reims (Reins) was a thirteenth-century trouvère, most likely from Reims. Elsewhere, however, Jehan d'Auxerre claims authorship of the second piece. As well, the various manuscripts, which usually differ only slightly, preserve widely divergent melodies of On soloit. In the Chansonnier de l'Arsenal, the melody is syllabic and symmetrical, within the range of a fifth.

References
Karp, T. C. "Gobin de Reims." Grove Music Online. Oxford Music Online. Accessed 20 September 2008.

Year of birth unknown
Trouvères
13th-century French people
Male classical composers
Year of death unknown